Golmaal Radhakrishna is a 1990 Indian Kannada comedy film directed and written by Om Sai Prakash. The film starred Anant Nag in the title role along with Chandrika and Vanitha Vasu in leading roles. The music of the film was composed by M. Ranga Rao.

Produced by K. Chidambara Shetty under Chitra Productions banner, the film was released in 1990 and met with positive response from critics and audience. The film was a remake of Telugu film Chalaki Mogudu Chadastapu Pellam.

Cast 

 Ananth Nag as Radhakrishna
 Chandrika
 Vanitha Vasu
 Umashree
 Leelavathi
 Mukhyamantri Chandru
 Sihi Kahi Chandru
 Satyabhama
 Dinesh
 Mysore Lokesh
 M. S. Umesh

Soundtrack 
The film's soundtrack was composed by M. Ranga Rao.

Sequel
A sequel to this film titled Golmaal Radhakrishna-2 was released in 1991 with Anant Nag and Chandrika reprising their roles. Actress Tara and Vanitha Vasu were also seen in the prominent roles. Much of the cast and crew were repeated in the sequel too barring the music director Ranga Rao replaced by Upendra Kumar.

References

External links 

1990 films
1990s Kannada-language films
Indian romantic comedy films
1990 romantic comedy films
Films scored by M. Ranga Rao
Kannada remakes of Telugu films
Films directed by Sai Prakash